Biser Georgiev (born 24 July 1973) is a Bulgarian wrestler. He competed in the men's Greco-Roman 68 kg at the 1996 Summer Olympics.

References

External links
 

1973 births
Living people
Bulgarian male sport wrestlers
Olympic wrestlers of Bulgaria
Wrestlers at the 1996 Summer Olympics
People from Samokov
Sportspeople from Sofia Province